Marc Albert (born November 15, 1961 in Caraquet) is a former Canadian Olympic volleyball player.

Albert led his Polyvalente Louis-Mailloux to New Brunswick provincial high school volleyball championships in 1978 and '79.  While attending the Université de Moncton he was named to the Canadian junior national team and in 1981 relocated to Calgary to join the senior national team.  He left the team however after 18 months to become a Calgary police officer.  He returned to the program in 1985 but left again after only a year to focus on work and family.  In 1989 however, an arrangement with the Calgary police force allowed him to return to national program.

Albert was named tournament MVP of the 1992 pre-Olympic qualifying tournament.  At the Olympics, the Canadians barely missed on advancing to the quarterfinals losing three 5-set matches along with defeating France.  They ended the tournament losing the 9-10 place game to South Korea.  Albert's personal accolades also include being the 3rd highest ranked attackers and 5th ranked receiver in the 1992 World Volleyball League.

In club volleyball during the 1980s his Canuck Stuff Club of Calgary was a three-time Canadian senior champion and Albert was a five-time all-star selection at the tournament.  After the '92 Olympics he returned to New Brunswick where he has been involved in teaching and coaching volleyball in grade school and university.

As of 2001 he was assistant coach at the Université de Moncton. Albert was inducted into the New Brunswick Sports Hall of Fame in 2001.  He has worked as sales manager for the Edmundston-Grand Falls-Campbellton area for the financial services company Assumption Life.

References
www.gnb.ca
Canadian Olympic Committee webpage profile

1961 births
Acadian people
Canadian men's volleyball players
Canadian police officers
Living people
Olympic volleyball players of Canada
People from Gloucester County, New Brunswick
Sportspeople from New Brunswick
New Brunswick Sports Hall of Fame inductees
Volleyball players at the 1992 Summer Olympics
Université de Moncton alumni
Academic staff of the Université de Moncton
People from Caraquet